Pashupati Shamsher Jang Bahadur Rana is a politician from the Rana dynasty. He served in the Ministry of Foreign Affairs, Ministry of Finance, Ministry of Water Resources and Communication (1990–1994), Minister of Water Resources (1995–97&1997–1998) after Panchayat era. He served as Minister of Panchayat and Local Development (1986–1988), Ministry of Transport and Tourism (1978–1979) and various other full ministers and state ministers during Panchayat era.

Family 
Pashupati Shamsher Jang Bahadur Rana was born to Lieutenant General Yuvaraja Bijaya Shamsher Jang Bahadur Rana, son of Field Marshal H.H. Shree Shree Shree Maharaja Sir Mohan Shamsher Jang Bahadur Rana. He was married to Maharani Usha Raje Scindia, daughter of Maratha Scindia, His Highness Maharaja of the Gwalior State, Jivajirao Scindia and Her Highness Maharani Vijayaraje Scindia in 1967 A.D. He has two daughters- Devyani Rana and Urvashi Rajya Lakshmi. Devyani Rana married the erstwhile Yuvraj of Singrauli; Aishvarya Singh, son of H.H. Maharaja Bhuvneshwar Prasad Singh and H.H. Maharani Veena Singh. Urvashi Rajya Lakshmi Rana married Shiv Khemka, a businessman from the "Marwadi" Community.

Titles

1941-1951: General Maharajkumar Shree Shree Pashupati Shamsher Jang Bahadur Rana

Electoral history
 1991 House of Representatives Election - Won
 1994 House of Representatives Election - Won
 1999 House of Representatives Election - Won
 2013 Constituent Assembly Election - Lost
 2013 Constituent Assembly Election - Lost
 2018 House of Representatives Election - Lost

Notable published works 
 Nepal's Forth Plan: A Critique (1971).
 Bikas Tatha Yojana (1971).
 Nepal in Perspective (1973).
 Kathmandu; a Living Heritage (1989).
 Contemporary Nepal (1998).
 The Ranas of Nepal (2002).

Honours
National Honours
  Order of the Gurkha Right Hand, First Class.
  King Birendra Corononation Medal (21 February 1975).
  Janamat Sangraha [Medal Service for the Referendum] (1980).

References

Rana dynasty
Rastriya Prajatantra Party politicians
Finance ministers of Nepal
Government ministers of Nepal
People from Kathmandu
1941 births
Living people
Members of the Order of Gorkha Dakshina Bahu, First Class
Foreign Ministers of Nepal
Members of the Rastriya Panchayat
Nepal MPs 1991–1994
Nepal MPs 1994–1999
Nepal MPs 1999–2002
20th-century Nepalese nobility
21st-century Nepalese nobility
Nepalese Hindus
Nepal MPs 2022–present